DPA-713 or N,N-diethyl-2-(4-methoxyphenyl)-5,7-dimethylpyrazolo[1,5-a]pyrimidine-3-acetamide is a selective ligand for the translocator protein (TSPO).

The binding affinity of DPA-713 for TSPO is reported as Ki = 4.7 ± 0.2 nM.

DPA-713 has been radiolabelled with carbon-11 as a potential radiotracer for imaging the TSPO using positron emission tomography (PET). Radiation dosimetry and biodistribution of [11C]DPA-713 have been assessed in healthy volunteers, indicating that [11C]DPA-713 is a suitable radiotracer for imaging the TSPO in humans.

See also 
 DPA-714

References 

Pyrazolopyrimidines
TSPO ligands